Wayne Ashley Merton (born 18 October 1943), a former Australian politician, was a Member of the New South Wales Legislative Assembly representing the electorates of Carlingford between 1988 and 1991 and Baulkham Hills between 1991 and 2011 for the Liberal Party. He was Minister for Justice and Minister for Emergency Services from October 1992 to May 1993.

He is married with three children.

In March 2010, Merton announced his decision to retire and would not contest the 2011 election. After a heated preselection campaign, David Elliott was chosen as his successor for the safe seat of Baulkham Hills.

References

 

Members of the New South Wales Legislative Assembly
Liberal Party of Australia members of the Parliament of New South Wales
Living people
1943 births
21st-century Australian politicians
Place of birth missing (living people)
Members of the Order of Australia